The first competition weekend of the 2008–09 ISU Speed Skating World Cup was held in the Sportforum Hohenschönhausen in Berlin, Germany, from Friday, 7 November, until Sunday, 9 November 2008.

Schedule of events
Schedule of the event:

Medal summary

Men's events

Women's events

References

1
Isu World Cup, 2008-09, 1
Speed skating in Berlin
2008 in Berlin